Shinton is a surname. Notable people with the surname include:

Bobby Shinton (born 1952), English footballer and manager
Fred Shinton (1883–1923), English footballer
Nick Shinton (born 2001), Belgian footballer